Leptospira inadai is a pathogenic species of Leptospira.

References

External links
Type strain of Leptospira inadai at BacDive -  the Bacterial Diversity Metadatabase

inadai
Bacteria described in 1987